Mescal and Mescall may refer to:

Places
 Mescal, Arizona, census designated place in Arizona
 Mescal Arroyo, creek in Pima County, Arizona
 Mescal Mountains, series of connected mountain ridges in southern Gila County, Arizona
 Mescal Range, mountain range in California

People
 Paul Mescal (born 1996), Irish actor
 Don Mescall, Irish singer-songwriter
 Greg Mescall (born 1981), sports commentator
 John J. Mescall (1899-1962), American cinematographer

Other
 Mescal agave, alternative name of the plant, Agave parryi
 Mescal bean, alternative name of the plant, Dermatophyllum

See also
 Mezcal, Mexican distilled alcoholic beverage
 Mescaline, naturally occurring psychedelic protoalkaloid
 Mescalito, small, spineless cactus also known as peyote